The First Battle of Kernstown was fought on March 23, 1862, in Frederick County and Winchester, Virginia, the opening battle of Confederate  Maj. Gen. Thomas J. "Stonewall" Jackson's campaign through the Shenandoah Valley during the American Civil War.

Attempting to tie down the Union forces in the Valley, under the overall command of Maj. Gen. Nathaniel P. Banks, Jackson received incorrect intelligence that a small detachment under Col. Nathan Kimball was vulnerable, but it was in fact a full infantry division more than twice the size of Jackson's force. His initial cavalry attack was forced back and he immediately reinforced it with a small infantry brigade. With his other two brigades, Jackson sought to envelop the Union right by way of Sandy Ridge. But Col. Erastus B. Tyler's brigade countered this movement, and, when Kimball's brigade moved to his assistance, the Confederates were driven from the field. There was no effective Union pursuit.

Although the battle was a Confederate tactical defeat, it represented a strategic victory for the South by preventing the Union from transferring forces from the Shenandoah Valley to reinforce the Peninsula Campaign against the Confederate capital, Richmond. Following the earlier Battle of Hoke's Run, the First Battle of Kernstown may be considered the second among Jackson's rare defeats.

Background

Jackson's division had been withdrawing "up" the Valley (to the higher elevations at the southwest end of the Valley) to cover the flank of Gen. Joseph E. Johnston's army, withdrawing from the Centreville–Manassas area to protect Richmond. Without this protective movement, the Federal army under Banks might strike at Johnston through passes in the Blue Ridge Mountains. By March 12, 1862, Banks occupied Winchester just after Jackson had withdrawn from the town, marching at a leisurely pace 42 miles up the Valley Pike to Mount Jackson. On March 21, Jackson received word that Banks was splitting his force, with two divisions (under Brig. Gens. John Sedgwick and Alpheus S. Williams) returning to the immediate vicinity of Washington, D.C., freeing up other Union troops to participate in Maj. Gen. George B. McClellan's Peninsula Campaign against Richmond. The remaining division, under Brig. Gen. James Shields, was stationed at Strasburg to guard the lower (northeastern) Valley, and intelligence indicated that it was withdrawing toward Winchester. Banks made preparations to leave the Valley personally on March 23.

Jackson's orders from Johnston were to prevent Banks's force from leaving the Valley, which it appeared they were now doing. Jackson turned his men around and, in one of the more grueling forced marches of the war, moved northeast 25 miles on March 22 and another 15 to Kernstown on the morning of March 23. His cavalry, under Col. Turner Ashby, skirmished with the Federals on March 22, during which engagement Shields was wounded with a broken arm from an artillery shell fragment. Despite his injury, Shields sent part of his division south of Winchester and one brigade marching to the north, seemingly abandoning the area, but in fact halting nearby to remain in reserve. He then turned over tactical command of his division to Col. Nathan Kimball, who ordered the Second Brigade and some of his own troops along the Valley Turnpike and, despite Shields's orders to pursue the Confederate cavalry, posted 16 guns and 800 infantrymen in a defensive position on the military crest of Prichard's Hill.  Confederate loyalists in Winchester mistakenly informed Turner Ashby that Shields had left only four regiments and a few guns (about 3,000 men) and that these remaining troops had orders to march for Harpers Ferry in the morning. Ashby, who normally had a reputation as a reliable cavalry scout, inexplicably did not verify the civilian reports and passed them on to Jackson. Jackson marched aggressively north with his 3,000-man division, reduced from its peak as stragglers fell out of the column, unaware that he was soon to be attacking almost 9,000 men.

Opposing forces
Key: k = killed, w = wounded

Union

Department of the Shenandoah
Maj. Gen. Nathaniel P. Banks (not present)
 Second Division
 Brig. Gen. James Shields (w March 22)
 Col. Nathan Kimball
 First Brigade: Col. Nathan Kimball
 14th Indiana Infantry: Lt. Col. William Harrow
 4th Ohio Infantry: Col. John S. Mason
 8th Ohio Infantry: Col. Samuel S. Carroll
 67th Ohio Infantry: Lt. Col. Alvin C. Voris
 84th Pennsylvania Infantry: Col. William Gray Murray (k)
 Second Brigade: Col. Jeremiah C. Sullivan
 5th Ohio Infantry: Lt. Col. John H. Patrick
 39th Illinois Infantry (not engaged): Col. Thomas O. Osborn
 13th Indiana Infantry: Lt. Col. Robert Sanford Foster
 62nd Ohio Infantry: Col. Francis Bates Pond
 Third Brigade: Col. Erastus B. Tyler
 7th Indiana Infantry: Lt. Col. John F. Creek
 7th Ohio Infantry: Lt. Col. William R. Creighton
 29th Ohio Infantry: Col. Lewis P. Buckley
 110th Pennsylvania Infantry: Col. William D. Lewis Jr.
 1st West Virginia Infantry: Col. Joseph Thoburn
 Cavalry Brigade: Col. Thornton F. Brodhead
 1st Michigan Cavalry (battalion): Lt. Col. Joseph T. Copeland
 1st Ohio Cavalry (Cos. A & C): Capt. Nathan D. Menken
 1st Squadron Pennsylvania Cavalry: Capt. John Keys
 1st West Virginia Cavalry (battalion): Maj. B. F. Chamberlain
 Independent companies, Maryland cavalry: Capt. Henry A. Cole, Capt. William Firey, and Capt. John Horner
 Artillery: Lt. Col. Philip Daum
 Battery H, 1st Ohio Light Artillery: Capt. James F. Huntington
 Battery L, 1st Ohio Light Artillery: Capt. Lucius N. Robinson
 Battery E, 4th U.S. Artillery: Capt. Joseph C. Clark Jr.
 Battery "A" West Virginia Light Artillery: Capt. John Jenks
 Battery "B" West Virginia Light Artillery

Confederate

Valley District, Department of Northern Virginia
Maj. Gen. Thomas J. "Stonewall" Jackson
 Jackson's Division
 Maj. Gen. Thomas J. "Stonewall" Jackson
 Stonewall Brigade: Brig. Gen. Richard B. Garnett
 2nd Virginia Infantry: Col. James W. Allen
 4th Virginia Infantry: Lt. Col. Charles A. Ronald, Maj. Albert G. Pendleton
 5th Virginia Infantry: Col. William H. Harman
 27th Virginia Infantry: Col. John Echols (w), Lt. Col. Andrew J. Grigsby
 33rd Virginia Infantry: Col. Arthur C. Cummings
 Rockbridge Battery, Virginia Artillery: Capt. William McLaughlin
 West Augusta Battery, Virginia Artillery: Capt. James Waters
 Carpenter's (Virginia) Battery: Capt. Joseph Carpenter
 Second (Burks') Brigade: Col. Jesse S. Burks
 21st Virginia Infantry: Lt. Col. John M. Patton, Jr.
 42nd Virginia Infantry: Lt. Col. Daniel A. Langhorne
 48th Virginia Infantry: Col. John A. Campbell (not engaged)
 1st Virginia Infantry Battalion (Irish): Capt. David B. Bridgford
 Hampden Virginia Artilley: Capt. Lawrence S. Marye 
 Pleasant's Virginia Battery (not engaged): Lt. James Pleasants
 Third (Fulkerson's) Brigade: Col. Samuel V. Fulkerson
 23rd Virginia Infantry: Lt. Col. Alexander G. Taliaferro
 37th Virginia Infantry: Lt. Col. Robert P. Carson
 Danville Artillery, Virginia Artillery: Lt. Albert C. Lanier
 Cavalry: Col. Turner Ashby
 7th Virginia Cavalry: Col. Turner Ashby
 Chew's Virginia Battery: Capt. R. Preston Chew

Battle

Jackson moved north from Woodstock and arrived before the Union position at Kernstown around 11 a.m., Sunday, March 23. The devoutly religious Jackson preferred to avoid battles on the Sabbath, but throughout his Civil War career he did not hesitate when military advantage could be gained. He later wrote to his wife:

Jackson performed no personal reconnaissance before he sent Turner Ashby on a feint against Kimball's position on the Valley Turnpike while his main force—the brigades of Col. Samuel Fulkerson and Brig. Gen. Richard B. Garnett (the Stonewall Brigade, Jackson's own first command)—attacked the Union artillery position on Pritchard Hill. The lead brigade under Fulkerson was repulsed, so Jackson decided to move around the Union right flank, about 2 miles west on Sandy Ridge, which appeared to be unoccupied. If this were successful, his men could move down the spine of the ridge and get into the Union rear, blocking their escape route to Winchester. Kimball countered the maneuver by moving his brigade under Col. Erastus B. Tyler to the west, but Fulkerson's men reached a stone wall facing a clearing on the ridge before the Union men could. Jackson's aide, Sandie Pendleton, obtained a clear view from the ridge of the Union forces arrayed against them and he estimated that there were 10,000. He reported this to Jackson, who replied, "Say nothing about it. We are in for it."

Around 4 p.m, Tyler attacked Fulkerson and Garnett by using an unorthodox approach with his brigade in "close column of divisions"—a brigade front of two companies with 48 companies lined up behind them in 24 lines, in all about 75 yards wide, and 400 yards long, a formation difficult to control and lacking offensive power at the front. The Confederates were temporarily able to counter this attack with their inferior numbers by firing fierce volleys from behind the stone wall. Jackson, finally realizing the strength of the force opposing him, sent out Col. Jesse Burks's brigade, which had been held in reserve, but by the time they arrived around 6 p.m., Garnett's Stonewall Brigade had run out of ammunition and he pulled them back, leaving Fulkerson's right flank exposed. Panic set in among the Confederates, and as Burks's brigade arrived, it was caught in the fleeing mob and forced to retreat. Jackson tried in vain to rally his troops. He called out to a soldier "Where are you going, man?" The soldier replied that he was out of ammunition. "Then go back and give them the bayonet!" Jackson said. However, the soldier ignored him and kept running. Kimball organized no effective pursuit. That night, a cavalryman sat with Jackson by a campfire alongside the Valley Pike and jokingly said "It was reported that they were retreating, General, but I guess they were retreating after us." Jackson, not known for his sense of humor, replied, "I think I am satisfied, sir."

Aftermath
Union casualties were 590 (118 killed, 450 wounded, 22 captured or missing), Confederate 718 (80 killed, 375 wounded, 263 captured or missing).

Despite the Union victory, President Abraham Lincoln was disturbed by Jackson's audacity and his potential threat to Washington. He sent Banks back to the Valley along with Alpheus Williams's division. He also was concerned that Jackson might move into western Virginia against Maj. Gen. John C. Frémont, so he ordered that the division of Brig. Gen. Louis Blenker be detached from McClellan's Army of the Potomac and sent to reinforce Frémont. Lincoln also took this opportunity to re-examine Maj. Gen. George B. McClellan's plans for the defenses of Washington while the Peninsula Campaign was underway and decided that the forces were insufficient. He eventually ordered that the corps of Maj. Gen. Irvin McDowell, which was moving south against Richmond in support of McClellan, remain in the vicinity of the capital. McClellan claimed that the loss of these forces prevented him from taking Richmond during his campaign. The strategic realignment of Union forces caused by Jackson's battle at Kernstown—the only battle he lost in his military career—turned out to be a strategic victory for the Confederacy. The remainder of Jackson's Valley Campaign consisted of lightning movements and five victories against superior forces organized into three Union armies, which elevated him to the position of the most famous general in the Confederacy (until this reputation was later supplanted by his superior, Gen. Robert E. Lee).

Jackson refused to accept any responsibility for the defeat and subsequently arrested the commander of his old Stonewall Brigade, Brig. Gen. Richard B. Garnett, for retreating from the battlefield before permission was received. The Stonewall Brigade's withdrawal, which came after it received the bulk of the Union fire and suffered the majority of Confederate casualties, uncovered the right of Fulkerson's Brigade, forcing it to also withdraw and starting a panic. He was replaced by Brig. Gen. Charles S. Winder. During the invasion of Maryland in September, Robert E. Lee ordered the charges against him dropped, but Garnett suffered from the humiliation of his court-martial for over a year, until he was killed at Gettysburg during Pickett's Charge.

A Second Battle of Kernstown occurred in the Valley Campaigns of 1864.

Battlefield preservation

The Civil War Trust (a division of the American Battlefield Trust) and its partners have acquired and preserved  of the First Kernstown battlefield. The Kernstown Battlefield Association owns and operates the Kernstown battlefields on the 1854 Pritchard-Grim Farm three miles southwest of Winchester, Va. The park has walking trails, a small museum and a visitor's center inside the farmhouse.

Notes

References

Bibliography

External links
 National Park Service battle description
 Battle of Kernstown in Encyclopedia Virginia
 The Battle of Kernstown: Battle Maps, History Articles, Photos, and Preservation News (CWPT)
 Kernstown Battlefield Association
 NPS report on battlefield condition
 Animated History of Jackson's Valley Campaign
 West Point Atlas map of Jackson's Valley Campaign

Kernstown I
Kernstown I
Kernstown I
Kernstown I
Kernstown
Winchester, Virginia
1862 in the American Civil War
1862 in Virginia
March 1862 events